John Sheffield, 2nd Baron Sheffield, of Butterwick (c. 1538 – 10 December 1568) was the first son of Edmund Sheffield, 1st Baron Sheffield, and Lady Anne de Vere.

He married Douglas Howard, daughter of William Howard, 1st Baron Howard of Effingham, and Margaret Gamage. They had two children:
Elizabeth Sheffield (died November, 1600) married Thomas Butler, 10th Earl of Ormonde
Edmund Sheffield, 1st Earl of Mulgrave (7 December 1564 – 6 October 1646) married (1) Ursulla Tyrwhitt (2) Mariana Irwin

References
Sheffield family Accessed February 18, 2008

Category:Barons Sheffield

1538 births
1568 deaths
John
16th-century English nobility
People from the Borough of Boston